Saint Anne's on the Sea is a town in the Borough of Fylde, Lancashire, England.  It contains 23 listed buildings that are recorded in the National Heritage List for England.  Of these, one is listed at Grade II*, the middle of the three grades, and the others are at Grade II, the lowest grade.  Until the 1870s the only buildings in the area now occupied by the town were scatted cottages.  In 1873 the architects Maxwell and Tuke were appointed to draw up a plan for the development of the town.  This has since grown to become a seaside resort and commuter town.  The listed buildings include churches and associated structures, public buildings, a hotel and its boundary wall, memorials, a bank, and a former school.  The structures relating to the town's function as a resort are a pier, a pavilion and shelters, fountains, and a bandstand.


Key

Buildings

References

Citations

Sources

Lists of listed buildings in Lancashire
Buildings and structures in the Borough of Fylde